Other Earths (2009) is an alternate history, science fiction anthology of all-new stories being edited by Nick Gevers and Jay Lake.

Contents
Robert Charles Wilson: This Peaceable Land, or, The Unbearable Vision of Harriet Beecher Stowe
Jeff VanderMeer: The Goat Variations
Stephen Baxter: The Unblinking Eye
Theodora Goss: Csilla's Story
Liz Williams: Winterborn
Gene Wolfe: Donovan Sent Us
Greg van Eekhout: The Holy City and Em's Reptile Farm
Alastair Reynolds: The Receivers
Paul Park: A Family History
Lucius Shepard: Dog-Eared Paperpack of My Life
Benjamin Rosenbaum: Nine Alternate Alternate Histories

References

External links
Review at io9

2009 anthologies
Alternate history anthologies
DAW Books books